The Garifuna people (  or ; pl. Garínagu in Garifuna) are a people of mixed free African and indigenous American ancestry that originated in the Caribbean island of Saint Vincent and speak Garifuna, an Arawakan language, and Vincentian Creole.

The Garifuna are the descendants of indigenous Arawak, Kalinago (Island Carib), and Afro-Caribbean people. The founding population of the Central American diaspora, estimated at 2,500 to 5,000 persons, were transplanted to the Central American coast from the Commonwealth Caribbean island of Saint Vincent, which was known to the Garinagu as Yurumein, in the Windward Islands in the British West Indies in the Lesser Antilles. Small Garifuna communities still live in Saint Vincent and the Grenadines. The Garifuna diaspora abroad includes communities in Honduras, in the United States, and in Belize.

Name

In the Garifuna language, the endonym Garínagu refers to the people as a whole and the term Garífuna refers to an individual person, the culture, and the language. The terms Garífuna and Garínagu originated as African modifications of the Kalinago terms Karifuna and Kalinago respectively. The terms may have been used by the Garifuna to refer to themselves as early as the mid-17th century.

The Garifuna were historically known by the exonyms Caribs, Black Caribs, and Island Caribs. European explorers began to use the term Black Caribs in the 17th century. In the 18th century, English accounts used the terms Black Caribs and Yellow or Red Caribs to differentiate, with some ambiguity, two groups with a similar culture by their skin color. The British colonial use of the term Black Carib, particularly in William Young's Account of the Black Charaibs (1795), has been described in modern historiography as framing the majority of the indigenous St. Vincent population as "mere interlopers from Africa" who lacked claims to land possession in St. Vincent.

History

Carib background
The Carib people migrated from the mainland to the islands circa 1200, according to carbon dating of artifacts. They largely displaced, exterminated and assimilated the Taíno who were resident on the islands at the time.

17th century
The French missionary Raymond Breton arrived in the Lesser Antilles in 1635, and lived on Guadeloupe and Dominica until 1653. He took ethnographic and linguistic notes on the native peoples of these islands, including St. Vincent, which he visited briefly.

In 1635 the Carib were overwhelmed by French forces led by the adventurer Pierre Belain d'Esnambuc and his nephew Jacques Dyel du Parquet. They imposed French colonial rule. Cardinal Richelieu of France gave the island to the Compagnie de Saint-Christophe, in which he was a shareholder. Later the company was reorganized as the Compagnie des Îles de l'Amérique. The French colonists imposed French Law on the inhabitants, and Jesuit missionaries arrived to convert them to the Catholic Church.

Because the Carib people resisted working as laborers to build and maintain the sugar and cocoa plantations which the French began to develop in the Caribbean, in 1636, Louis XIII of France proclaimed La Traité des Noirs. This authorized the capture and purchase of enslaved people from sub-Saharan Africa and their transportation as labor to Martinique and other parts of the French West Indies.

In 1650, the Company liquidated, selling Martinique to Jacques Dyel du Parquet, who became governor. He held this position until his death in 1658. His widow Mme. du Parquet took over control of the island from France. As more French colonists arrived, they were attracted to the fertile area known as Cabesterre (leeward side). The French had pushed the remaining Carib people to this northeastern coast and the Caravalle Peninsula, but the colonists wanted the additional land. The Jesuits and the Dominicans agreed that whichever order arrived there first, would get all future parishes in that part of the island. The Jesuits came by sea and the Dominicans by land, with the Dominicans' ultimately prevailing.

When the Carib revolted against French rule in 1660, the Governor Charles Houël du Petit Pré retaliated with war against them. Many were killed; those who survived were taken captive and expelled from the island. On Martinique, the French colonists signed a peace treaty with the few remaining Carib. Some Carib had fled to Dominica and Saint Vincent, where the French agreed to leave them at peace.

William Young's report
After the arrival of the English to St. Vincent in 1667, English Army officer John Scott wrote a report on the island for the English crown, noting that St. Vincent was populated by Caribs and a small number of Blacks from two Spanish slave ships which had wrecked on its shores. Later, in 1795, the British governor of St. Vincent, William Young, noted in another report, addressed to the British Crown, that the island was populated by Black enslaved people from two Spanish slave ships that had sunk near the island of San Vincent in 1635 (although, according to other authors such as Idiáquez, the two slave ships wrecked between 1664 and 1670). The slave ships were destined to the West Indies (Bahamas and Antilles). According to Young's report, after the wreck, enslaved people from the Igbo ethnic group from what is now Nigeria, escaped and reached the small island of Bequia. There, the Caribs enslaved them and brought them to Saint Vincent. However, according to Young, the enslaved people were too independent of "spirit", prompting the Caribs to make plans to kill all the African male children. When Africans heard about the Caribs' plan, they rebelled and killed all the Caribs they could find, then headed to the mountains, where they settled and lived with other enslaved people who had taken refuge there before them. From the mountains, the former enslaved people attacked and killed the Caribs continually, reducing them in number.

Modern historiography

Several modern researchers have rejected the theory espoused by Young. According to them, most of the enslaved people who arrived in Saint Vincent actually came from other Caribbean islands, and had settled in Saint Vincent in order to escape slavery, therefore Maroons came from plantations on nearby islands. Although most of the enslaved people came from Barbados (most of the enslaved people of this island were from present-day Nigeria and Ghana), but they also came from places such as St. Lucia (where enslaved people likely came from what is now Senegal, Nigeria, Angola) and Grenada (where there were many enslaved people from Guinea, Sierra Leone, Nigeria, Angolan, Kongo and Ghana). The Barbadians and Saint Lucians arrived on the island before 1735. Later, after 1775, most of the enslaved people who arrived from other islands were Saint Lucians and Grenadians. After arriving on the island, they were taken in by the Caribs, who offered them protection, enslaved them and, eventually mixed with them.

In addition to the African refugees, the Caribs captured enslaved people from neighboring islands (although they also had white people and their fellow Caribs as enslaved people), while they were fighting against the British and the French. Many of the captured enslaved people were integrated into their communities (this also occurred in islands such as Dominica). After the African rebellion against the Caribs, and their escape to the mountains, over time, according  to Itarala, Africans would come down from the mountains to have sexual intercourse with Amerindian women - perhaps because most Africans were men - or to search for other kinds of food. The sexual activity did not necessarily lead to marriage. On the other hand, if the Maroons abducted Arauaco-Caribbean women or married them, is another of the contradictions between the French documents and the oral history of the Garinagu. Andrade Coelho states that "...whatever the case, the Caribs never consented to give their daughters in marriage to blacks". Conversely, Sebastian R. Cayetano argues that "Africans were married with women Caribs of the islands, giving birth to the Garifuna". According to Charles Gullick some Caribs mixed peacefully with the Maroons and some not, creating two factions, that of the Black Caribs and that of the Yellow Caribs, who fought on more than one occasion in the late seventeenth and early eighteenth centuries. According to Itarala, many intermarried between indigenous and African people, which was that which caused the origin of the Black Caribs.

18th century

Britain and France both made conflicting claims on Saint Vincent from the late seventeenth century onward.  French pioneers began informally cultivating plots on the island around 1710. In 1719 the governor of the French colony of Martinique sent a military force to occupy it, but was repulsed by the Carib inhabitants.  A British attempt in 1723 was likewise repelled. In 1748, Britain and France agreed to put aside their claims and declared Saint Vincent to be a neutral island, under no European sovereignty. Throughout this period, however, unofficial, mostly French settlement took place on the island, especially on the Leeward side. African escapees continued to reach Saint Vincent, and a mixed-race population developed through unions with the Carib.

In 1763 by the Treaty of Paris, Britain gained control over Saint Vincent following its defeat of France in the Seven Years' War, fought in Europe, Asia and North America. It also took over all French territory in North America east of the Mississippi River. Through the rest of the century, the Carib-African natives mounted a series of Carib Wars, which were encouraged and supported by the French.

Carib wars

When in 1627 the English began to claim the St. Vincent island, they opposed the French settlements (which had started around 1610 by cultivating plots) and its partnerships with the Caribs. Over time, tensions began to arise between the Caribs and the Europeans. The governor of the English part of the island, William Young, complained that the Black Caribs had the best land and they had no right to live there. Moreover, the friendship of the French settlers with the Black Caribs, drove them, even though they had also tried to stay with San Vicente, tried to support them in their struggle. All this caused the "War Caribbean". The First Carib War began in 1769.  Led primarily by Black Carib chieftain Joseph Chatoyer, the Caribs successfully defended the windward side of the island against a military survey expedition in 1769, and rebuffed repeated demands that they sell their land to representatives of the British colonial government.  The effective defense of the Caribs, the British ignorance of the region and London opposition to the war made this be halted.  With military matters at a stalemate, a peace agreement was signed in 1773 that delineated boundaries between British and Carib areas of the island.  The treaty delimited the area inhabited by the Caribs, and demanded repayment of the British and French plantations of runaway enslaved people who took refuge in St. Vincent. This last clause, and the prohibition of trade with neighbouring islands, so little endeared the Caribs. Three years later, the French supported American independence (1776-1783); the Caribs aligned against the British. Apparently, in 1779 the Caribs inspired such terror to the British that surrender to the French was preferable than facing the Caribs in battle.

Later, in 1795, the Caribs again rebelled against British control of the island, causing the Second Carib War. Despite the odds being against them, the Caribs successfully gained control of most of the island except for the immediate area around Kingstown, which was saved from direct assault on several occasions by the timely arrival of British reinforcements. British efforts to penetrate and control the interior and windward areas of the island were repeatedly frustrated by incompetence, disease, and effective Carib defences, which were eventually supplemented by the arrival of some French troops. A major military expedition by General Ralph Abercromby was eventually successful in defeating the Carib opposition in 1796.

After the war was concluded and the Caribs surrendered, the British authorities decided to deport the Caribs of St. Vincent. This was done to avoid the Caribs causing more slave revolts in St. Vincent. In 1797, the Caribs with African features were chosen to be deported as they were considered the cause of the revolt, and originally exported them to Jamaica, and then they were transported to the island of Roatan in Honduras. Meanwhile, the Black Caribs with higher Amerindian traits were allowed to remain on the island. More than 5,000 Black Caribs were deported, but when the deportees landed on Roatan on April 12, 1797, only about 2,500 had survived the trip to the islands. Since this was too small and infertile a number to maintain the population, the Black Caribs asked the Spanish authorities of Honduras to be allowed to live on land. The Spanish allowed to change the use them as soldiers. After settling in the Honduras, they expanded along the Caribbean coast of Central America, coming to Belize and Guatemala to the north, and the south to Nicaragua. Over time, the Black Caribs would denominate in the mainland of Central America as "Garifuna".

19th century
This was also in the period of the Haitian Revolution in the French colony of Saint-Domingue, which ultimately led to the enslaved people creating the independent republic of Haiti in 1804. The French lost thousands of troops in an attempt to take back the island in 1803, many to yellow fever epidemics. Thousands of whites and free people of color were killed in the revolution. Europeans throughout the Caribbean and in the Southern United States feared future slave revolts.

Large-scale sugar production and chattel slavery were not established on Saint Vincent until the British assumed control. As the United Kingdom abolished slavery in 1833, it operated it for roughly a generation on the island, creating a legacy different from on other Caribbean islands.  Elsewhere, slavery had been institutionalized for much longer.

20th and 21st centuries
In the 21st century, the Garifuna population is estimated to be around 600,000 in total, taking together its people in Central America, Yurumein (Saint Vincent and the Grenadines), and the United States.  As a result of extensive emigration from Central America, the United States has the second-largest population of Garifuna outside Central America.  New York City, specifically in the Bronx, has the largest population, dominated by Garifuna from Honduras, Guatemala and Belize.  Los Angeles ranks second with Belizean Garifuna being the most populous, followed by those from Honduras and Guatemala.  There are also growing Garifuna populations in Houston, Atlanta, and New Orleans. There is no information regarding Garifuna from Nicaragua having migrated to either coast of the United States. The Nicaraguan Garifuna population is quite small. Community leaders are attempting to resurrect the Garifuna language and cultural traditions.

By 2014 more Garifuna were leaving Honduras and immigrating to the United States.

Language

The Garifuna people speak Garifuna and Vincentian Creole.

The Garifuna language is an offshoot of the Arawak language, and it is spoken in Honduras, Belize, Guatemala, and Nicaragua by the Garifuna people. It is an Arawakan language with French, English, Dutch, African, and Spanish influences, reflecting their long interaction with various colonial peoples. Garifuna has a vocabulary featuring some terms used by women and others used primarily by men. This may derive from historical Carib practices: in the colonial era, the Carib of both sexes spoke Island Carib. Men additionally used a distinct pidgin based on the unrelated Carib language of the mainland.

Almost all Garinagu are bilingual or multilingual. They generally speak the official languages of the countries they reside in, such as Spanish or English, most commonly as a first language. Many also speak Garifuna, mostly as a cultural language, as a part of their families' heritage.

Garifuna is a language and not a dialect. Garinagu are now writing their own narrative based on their historical and cultural experiences.

Demographics

In 2011, it was estimated that the Garifuna population consisted of roughly 400,000 people, mostly living in Honduras and the United States.

Saint Vincent
In 1805, the remaining Garifuna in Morne Ronde on Saint Vincent numbered 16 men, 9 women, and 20 children, although others remained on the island in hiding after the deportations of 1797. The 1844 census of Saint Vincent listed 273 "Black Caribs". The 1960 census listed 1,265 "Black Caribs" in Saint Vincent. In 1984, anthropologist Michael Crawford estimated that 1,100–2,000 Garifuna resided in Saint Vincent.

Central America
By 1981, around 65,000 Garifuna were living in fifty-four fishing villages in Guatemala, Belize, and Nicaragua.

Culture

In 2001 UNESCO proclaimed the language, dance, and music of the Garifuna as a Masterpiece of the Oral and Intangible Heritage of Humanity in Nicaragua, Honduras, and Belize. In 2005 the First Garifuna Summit was held in Corn Islands, Nicaragua, with the participation of the government of other Central American countries.

Food
There is a wide variety of Garifuna dishes, including the more commonly known ereba (cassava bread) made from grated cassava root, yuca. The process of making "ereba" is arguably the most important tradition practiced by the Garifuna people.  Cassava is so closely tied to the Garifuna culture that the very name Garifuna draws its origin from the Caribs who were originally called  "Karifuna" of the cassava clan.  They later adopted the name "Garifuna", which literally means cassava-eating people. Making "ereba" is a long and arduous process that involves a large group of Garinagu women and children for the most part. Cassava is mostly grown on the farms of the garinagu. When it is ready be harvested, it is mostly done in large quantities (usually several dozen pounds of the cassava root) and taken to the village. The root is then washed peeled and grated over small sharp stones affixed to wooden boards.  The grating is difficult and time-consuming, and the women would sing songs to break the monotony of the work. The grated cassava is then placed into a large cylindrical woven bag called a "ruguma". The "ruguma" is hung from a tree and weighted at the bottom with heavy rocks in order to squeeze out and remove the poisonous liquid and starch from the grated pulp.  The counterweight is sometimes provided by piercing the bottom of the "ruguma" with a tree branch and having one or two women sit on the branch. Whatever the manner in which the weight is provided, the result is the same.  The cassava is then ready to be made into flour.  The remaining pulp is dried overnight and later sieved through flat rounded baskets (hibise) to form flour that is baked into pancakes on a large iron griddle (Comal). Ereba is eaten with fish, machuca (pounded green and ripe plantains) or alone with gravy (lasusu) often made with a fish soup called "Hudut". Other accompanying dishes may include: bundiga (a green banana lasusu), mazapan (breadfruit), and bimecacule (sticky sweet rice), as well as a coconut rice made with red beans.  Nigerians also make "eba", "gari" and "fufu" from dried, grated cassava flour and similar accompanying dishes such as "efo-riro" (made from spinach leaves) or egusi" (made with grounded melon seeds) soup. An alcoholic drink called gifiti is commonly made at home; it is rum-based bitters, made by soaking roots and herbs.

Music

In contemporary Belize there has been a resurgence of Garifuna music, popularized by musicians such as Andy Palacio, Mohobub Flores, and Aurelio Martinez.  These musicians have taken many aspects from traditional Garifuna music forms and fused them with more modern sounds.  Described as a mixture of punta rock and paranda, this music is exemplified in Andy Palacio's album Watina, and in Umalali: The Garifuna Women's Project, both of which were released on the Belizean record label, Stonetree Records. Canadian musician Danny Michel has also recorded an album, Black Birds Are Dancing Over Me, with a collective of Garifuna musicians.

Through traditional dance and music, musicians have come together to raise awareness of HIV/AIDS.

Spirituality
The majority of Garinagu have been Catholic since the community's historical encounters with the Jesuits, Dominicans, and various Catholic colonial powers (namely the French and Spanish) in the West Indies and Central America.

A complex set of practices exist in their traditional religion for individuals and groups to show respect for their ancestors and Bungiu (God) or Sunti Gabafu (All Powerful). A shaman known as a buyei is the head of all Garifuna traditional practices. The spiritual practices of the Garinagu have qualities similar to the voodoo (as the Europeans put it) rituals performed by other tribes of African descent. Mystical practices and participation such as in the Dugu ceremony and chugu are also widespread among Garifuna. At times, traditional religions have prohibited members of their congregation from participating in these or other rituals.

Society
Gender roles within the Garifuna communities are significantly defined by the job opportunities available to everyone. The Garifuna people have relied on farming for a steady income in the past, but much of this land was taken by fruit companies in the 20th century. These companies were welcomed at first because the production helped bring an income to the local communities, but as business declined these large companies sold the land and it has become inhabited by mestizo farmers.  Since this time the Garifuna people have been forced to travel and find jobs with foreign companies. The Garifuna people mainly rely on export businesses for steady jobs; however, women are highly discriminated against and are usually unable to get these jobs. Men generally work for foreign-owned companies collecting timber and chicle to be exported, or work as fishermen.

Garifuna people live in a matrilocal society, but the women are forced to rely on men for a steady income in order to support their families, because the few jobs that are available, housework and selling homemade goods, do not create enough of an income to survive on. Although women have power within their homes, they rely heavily on the income of their husbands.

Although men can be away at work for large amounts of time they still believe that there is a strong connection between men and their newborn sons.  Garifunas believe that a baby boy and his father have a special bond, and they are attached spiritually. It is important for a son's father to take care of him, which means that he must give up some of his duties in order to spend time with his child. During this time women gain more responsibility and authority within the household.

Genetics and ancestors
According to one genetic study the ancestry of the Garifuna people on average, is 76% African, 20% Arawak/Carib and 4% European. The admixture levels vary greatly between island and Central American Garinagu Communities with Stann Creek, Belize Garinagu having 79.9% African, 2.7% European and 17.4% Amerindian and Sandy Bay, St. Vincent Garinagu having 41.1% African, 16.7% European and 42.2% Amerindian.

African origins
Based on oral traditions, according to some authors, the Garifuna are descendants of Caribbeans with the African origins Efik (Nigeria-Cameroon residents), Ibo (Nigeria, Cameroon, Equatorial Guinea), Fons (residents between Benin - Nigeria), Ashanti (from Ashanti Region, in central Ghana), Yoruba (resident in Togo, Benin, Nigeria) and Kongo (Congo, DR Congo and Angola), obtained in the coastal regions of West and Central Africa by Spanish and Portuguese traders of enslaved people. These enslaved people were trafficked to other Caribbean islands, from where emigrated or were captured (they or their descendants) to Saint Vincent.

In this way, the anthropologist and Garifuna historian Belizean Sebastian R. Cayetano says African ancestors of the Garifuna are ethnically West African "specifically of the Yoruba, Ibo, and Ashanti tribes, in what is now Ghana, Nigeria, and Sierra Leone, to mention only a few." To Roger Bastide, the Garifuna almost inaccessible fortress of Northeast Saint Vincent integrated constantly to Yoruba, Fon, Fanti-Ashanti and Kongo fugitives. These African origins are true at least in the masculine gender. For the female gender, the origins comes from the union of black enslaved people with Caribs. Based on 18th-century English documents, Ruy Galvao de Andrade Coelho suggests that came from Nigeria, Gold Coast, Dahomey, Congo "and other West African regions".
 
At the beginning of the 18th century the population in Saint Vincent was already mostly black and although during this century there were extensive mixtures and black people and Carib Indians, a less admixed Carib group, which was called Red Caribs to differentiate them from Black Caribs, continued to exist.

Notable people

 Boniek García
Carlos Bernárdez
 Carlos Sánchez
 César Romero
 Danilo Acosta
 Edwin Solano
 Marvin Avila
 Dionisia Amaya
 Theodore Aranda
 Rosita Baltazar
 Victor Bernardez
 Sofía Blanco
 Joseph Chatoyer
 Duvalle
 Osman Chavez
 Mirtha Colón
 Teofilo Colon
 Carlo Costly
 Félix Crisanto
 Wilmer Crisanto
 Evil E
 Maynor Figueroa
 Brian Flores
 Alejandro Galindo 
 O.T. Genasis
 Abraham Laboriel
 Abe Laboriel Jr.
 Krisean Lopez 
 Aurelio Martínez
 Bernard Martínez Valerio
 John Méndez
 Paul Nabor
 Eugenio Dolmo Flores
 Tomás Róchez
 Rakeem Nuñez-Roches
 Paul Nabor
 Andy Palacio
 Joseph Palacio
 Jerry Palacios
 Johnny Palacios
 Wilson Palacios
 Teodoro Palacios Flores
 Kosine
 Guillermo Ramírez
 Thomas Vincent Ramos
 David Suazo
 Édgar Álvarez
 Romell Quioto
 Jerry Bengtson
 Jorge Benguché
 Luis Palma

See also

 Black Seminoles
 British Honduras
 Dangriga
 Garifuna in Peril
 Happy Land fire
 Lebeha Drumming Center
 Miskito people
 Obeah
 Punta
 Sambo Creek
 Zambo

Notes

References

Bibliography
Anderson, Mark. When Afro Becomes (like) Indigenous: Garifuna and Afro-Indigenous Politics in Honduras. Journal of Latin American and Caribbean Anthropology 12.2 (2007): 384–413. AnthroSource. Web. 20 January 2010.
 
Chernela, Janet M. Symbolic Inaction in Rituals of Gender and Procreation among the Garifuna (Black Caribs) of Honduras. Ethos 19.1 (1991): 52–67. AnthroSource. Web. 13 January 2010.
Dzizzienyo, Anani, and Suzanne Oboler, eds. Neither Enemies Nor Friends: Latinos, Blacks, Afro-Latinos. 2005.
 Flores, Barbara A.T. (2001) Religious education and theological praxis in a context of colonization: Garifuna spirituality as a means of resistance.  Ph.D. Dissertation, Garrett/Northwestern University, Evanston, Illinois. OCLC 47773227
 Franzone, Dorothy (1995) A Critical and Cultural Analysis of an African People in the Americas: Africanisms in the Garifuna Culture of Belize. PhD Thesis, Temple University. UMI Dissertation Services (151–152). OCLC 37128913
 
 
Griffin, Wendy. "The 21st Century Battle fought by Honduras Indigenous to know their history and maintain their identity," Honduras Weekly, reprinted by Latina Lista, November 7, 2013.
Griffin, Wendy and Comité de Emergencia de Garifuna Honduras. San Pedro Sula: Comité de Emergencia de Garifuna Honduras, 2005.
Griffith, Marie, and Darbara Dianne Savage, eds. Women and Religion in the African Diaspora: Knowledge, Power, and Performance. 2006.
Herlihy, Laura Hobson. Sexual Magic and Money: Miskitu women’s Strategies in Northern Honduras. Ethnology 46.2 (2006): 143–159. Web. 13 January 2010.
Loveland, Christine A., and Frank O. Loveland, eds. Sex Roles and Social Change in Native Lower Central American Societies.
McClaurin, Irma. Women of Belize: Gender and Change in Central America. 1996. New Brunswick: Rutgers UP, 2000.

External links

 Garifuna Heritage Foundation – St Vincent
 Garifuna Research Institute
 Garifuna Heritage Foundation
 Garifuna in Honduras
 Warasa Garifuna Drum School
 Garífunas Confront Their Own Decline by Michael Deibert, Inter Press Service, Oct 6, 2008
  Examining the impact of changing livelihood strategies upon Garifuna Cultural Identity, Cayos Cochinos, Honduras
 The Garifuna on NationalGeographic.com
 Garifuna.org
 ONECA (Organización Negra Centroamericana)
 Vacation in Hopkins a Garifuna Community
 Pen Cayetano
 – "We are free" Mali Cayetano

 
African–Native American relations
Afro-Belizean
Bay Islands Department
Ethnic groups in the Caribbean
Ethnic groups in Central America
Ethnic groups in Nicaragua
Ethnic groups in Honduras
Ethnic groups in Belize
Ethnic groups in Guatemala
Indigenous peoples of the Caribbean
Indigenous peoples of Central America
Multiracial affairs in the Americas
People of African descent
Slavery in the British West Indies
Central America and the Caribbean